Chethan Kumar is an Indian filmmaker, lyrics writer, screenwriter, dialogue writer and director who primarily works in Kannada cinema. His debut directional venture was the 2014 film Bahaddur.

Career
Kumar stepped into film industry unexpectedly. He was writing dialogues for theatre plays in Kalamandir, Mysore through one of his friend he learned of Tushar Ranganath. He joined Tushar Ranganth and worked with him as a dialogue writer for Devru, Kari Chirathe, Gange Bare Tunge Bare, Kanteerava.

Music director Arjun Janya noticed his talent and gave him a chance to write a song lyric for Varadhanayaka. As Arjun Janya said, he wrote "Baite Baite" song which became popular song of that year and made him a songwriter. Then he wrote "Auto Raja Auto Raja" for Auto Raja, "I wanna sing a songu" for Sweety Nanna Jodi, "Bossu Nam Bossu" for Bhajarangi including songs for Rajani Kantha, Shatru, Pulakeshi, Jackson, Ranna and also "Starade" , "Subbalakshmi" for his debut directional 2014 film Bahaddur and he is known for introductory songs he wrote for all stars including Darshan (Jaggudada), Yash (Santhu Straight Forward), Puneeth Rajkumar (Anjaniputra), Sudeep (Hebbuli), Ganesh (Pataki), Duniyaviji (Jackson), Sharan (Jai Maruthi800), Shivarajkumar (Killing Veerappan and Bhajarangi) Dhananjaya (Badmash), Madarangi Krishna (Charlie), Nikhil Kumarswamy (Jaguar) and for more than fifty films. He also worked with directors Mahesh Babu, Nagashekar, Preetham Gubbi, A.P.Arjun before becoming an independent director. In 2012 he did a documentary Starring Chandan Shetty called as "Yen Madli?".

He made his directional debut in 2014 with Block buster Bahaddur. His next film is Bharjari starring Dhruva Sarja, Rachita Ram, Hariprriya and Vaishali Deepak became Mega Blockbuster hit of 2017. His next film is Bharaate starring Sriimurali, Sreeleela became Mega Blockbuster hit of 2019.

He is now working with Puneeth Rajkumar for his fourth venture. Meanwhile, he wrote dialogues for Anjaniputra, College Kumara, Yajamana and Orange.

Personal life
Chethan Kumar was born in Kollegal, Karnataka and brought up in Mysore.

Filmography 

All films are in Kannada, the language is otherwise noted.

As lyricist

Advertising director
Agriculture Advertisement with Dr Shivarajkumar

Awards 
 Chithrasanthe Award Best Director, Dialogues & Screenplay, Popular Lyricist, 2015 - Chethan Kumar (Movie: Bahaddur) 
 Bangalore International Film Festival Award (Movie: Bharjari) 
 Siima 2019 Best Lyricist Award Kannada – Yenammi Yenammi (Movie: Ayogya)
 Chithrasante 2019 Popular Lyricist Award Kannada (Movie: Ayogya)
 Hungama Music 2019 - Sound of Fame Award - Song of the year Kannada - Yenammi Yenammi(Movie: Ayogya)
 Chithra Rising Star 2019 - Chethan Kumar

Footnotes

References

External links

Living people
Film directors from Bangalore
Kannada-language lyricists
Screenwriters from Bangalore
Kannada film directors
People from Chamarajanagar district
1988 births